Körner's Morning (Körners Vormittag) is a verse play by Friedrich Schiller. His only comedy, it was written for his friend Christian Gottfried Körner's birthday, probably between 5 June and 2 July 1787. Intended to be privately produced, it parodies the Dresden circle around Körner and his tendency not to finish works or only to finish them with great difficulty.

It was first published by Carl Künzel in 1862 (over 55 years after Schiller's death) as Ich habe mich rasieren lassen (I let myself shave). It shows a domestic phase in Schiller's life and simultaneously documents a piece of 18th century everyday life.

Plot

Writing and publication

Background

Features and reception

Editions 
 Friedrich von Schiller: Ich habe mich rasieren lassen: Ein dramatischer Scherz von Friedrich von Schiller. Verlag der Englischen Kunst-Anstalt A. H. Payne 1862

Bibliography
 Peter-André Alt: Körners Vormittag. In: Schiller, Leben – Werk – Zeit, Erster Band, München 2000, S. 424–425
 Grit Dommes: Körners Vormittag. In: Schiller-Handbuch, Leben – Werk – Wirkung, Hrsg. Matthias Luserke-Jaqui, Metzler, Stuttgart 2005, S. 88–92

References 

Plays by Friedrich Schiller
1787 plays
Comedy plays